Santa Fe Federal Savings and Loan Association, also known as American Savings and the Palm Springs Art Museum Architecture & Design Center/Edwards Harris Pavilion, is a historic building located in Palm Springs, California. The building is a fine example of the short span of time that master architect E. Stewart Williams used the International Style of architecture for commercial buildings in the early 1960s. The inspiration for this building was the Barcelona Pavilion (1929) by Ludwig Mies van der Rohe. The single-story structure features a flat roof, deep overhangs, steel-frame construction, thin steel posts, and large glass surface areas. Full-height sliding perforated metal panels were used to control the sunshine into the interior. The building was listed on the National Register of Historic Places in 2016.

References

Commercial buildings completed in 1960
Buildings and structures in Palm Springs, California
National Register of Historic Places in Riverside County, California
Bank buildings on the National Register of Historic Places in California
Modernist architecture in California
E. Stewart Williams buildings
1960 establishments in California